Diplomatic relations exist between Azerbaijan and the Netherlands.

History 
The Kingdom of the Netherlands recognized the independence of the Republic of Azerbaijan on 31 December 1991. Since 1 April 1992, bilateral relations between two countries have been started. President of Azerbaijan Ilham Aliyev signed an order on opening an embassy of the Kingdom of Netherlands on 20 September 2005.

On 24 April 2007, Ambassador Fuad Iskenderov presented his credentials to the Queen of the Kingdom of the Netherlands, Beatrix Wilhelmina Armgard.

On 26 June 2009 the Government of Netherlands decided to open an embassy in Azerbaijan and in August of the same year ambassador of Netherlands to Czech Republic Lucas van Horn was appointed to the post. On 23 October 2009 Y.L.van Horn presented his credentials to the president of Azerbaijan and began its activity.

On 16 August 2010 new ambassador of the Kingdom of Netherlands presented his credentials to the president of Azerbaijan.

Presently Onno Kervers is the Ambassador of the Netherlands in Azerbaijan.

Diplomatic relations

State visits

Contracts 
So far 10 agreements have been signed between Azerbaijan and the Kingdom of Netherlands:

 Azerbaijan and Netherlands signed an agreement on air transportation on 11 July 1996. 
 A memorandum of Understanding on cooperation program was signed on 24 April 1998. 
 An Agreement on mutual administrative assistance on the proper application of customs legislation and prevention, investigation, and combating of customs offenses was signed on January 30, 2002.
 An Agreement of Understanding on cooperation program was signed on February 22, 2002
 An Agreement of Understanding on cooperation was signed between the Ministry of Justice of the Kingdom of Netherland and the Ministry of Justice of Azerbaijan. 
 An Agreement on international auto shipping was signed on 25 May 2004. 
 An Agreement on the avoidance of double taxation and the prevention of fiscal evasion with respect to taxes on income and on capital. 
 Memorandum of Understanding between the State Border Service of the Republic of Azerbaijan and the Repatriation and Departure Service of the Kingdom of the Netherlands on the fight against illegal migration (1 July 2009) 
 The Memorandum of Understanding between the Ministry of Internal Affairs of the Republic of Azerbaijan and the Ministry of Justice of the Kingdom of the Netherlands in the field of non-operating cooperation (10 August 2010)
 The Memorandum of Understanding between the Ministry of Emergency Situations of the Republic of Azerbaijan and the Ministry of Infrastructure and Environment of the Kingdom of the Netherlands in the field of water management cooperation (6 November 2014)

Economic relations  
The economic relations between Azerbaijan and the Netherlands cover different fields. Azerbaijan and Netherlands cooperate in different directions in order to enhance the economic relations in the fields such as industry, producing, processing, and packing of agricultural production, ICT, tourism, health, ecology, as well as the Netherlands companies in industrial parks in Azerbaijan.

Azerbaijan is one of the main trading partners of Europe in the South Caucasus. It has a specific role in energy security in Europe. In recent years, new steps are taken on developing cooperation between Azerbaijan and Netherlands. More than 100 companies with Netherlands capital are operating in Azerbaijan. Their activity area hosts activities in the fields of financing, industry, construction, service, trade, agriculture, transport and ecology, etc. in Azerbaijan.

So far Netherlands made nearly $670 million direct investments in different fields of Azerbaijan's economy. In recent years trade turnover between Azerbaijan and Netherlands has reached about 200 million dollars per year. Azerbaijan exports mainly oil and gas products to the Netherlands. Dutch companies are interested in participating in the projects covering different areas in Azerbaijan as a contractor. Azerbaijan cooperates with Dutch companies in the field of rehabilitation of the Absheron lakes, including Boyukshor Lake.

Other fields of bilateral cooperation 
Azerbaijan and Netherlands signed an agreement on Joint MBA (Master of Business Administration) program covering the field of energy management in 2013. The program between Azerbaijan Diplomatic Academy and Maastricht School of Management successfully continues. The program provides graduates with the diplomas of both ADA and MSM.

Every year Clingendael Institute of Netherlands holds training for Eastern Partnership countries’ diplomats. Within the cooperation between Azerbaijan Diplomatic Academy and Clingendael Institute diplomats of the Academy participate in the training every year.

Annual seminars on the Armenia-Azerbaijan Nagorno-Karabakh conflict are organized within the framework of the cooperation with the Hague Academy of International Law. Specialists in international law and legal affairs are involved in the seminars.

Embassies 
The Embassy of Azerbaijan is located in The Hague, the Netherlands. The Embassy of the Netherlands is located in Baku, Azerbaijan.

Diplomacy

Republic of Azerbaijan
The Hague (Embassy)

of the Netherlands
Baku (Embassy)

See also
 Foreign relations of Azerbaijan
 Foreign relations of the Netherlands
 Azerbaijan–EU relations
 Azerbaijanis in the Netherlands
 Azerbaijanis in Europe 
 Dutchs in Azerbaijan

References

External links 
 President Aliyev: Relations between Azerbaijan and the Netherlands develop actively
 Azerbaijan-Netherlands relations actively developing - President Ilham Aliyev
 Dutch–Azerbaijani economic relations forged in Maastricht | The European Azerbaijan Society

 
Netherlands
Bilateral relations of the Netherlands